Carl Quicklund (born 28 January 1992) is a Swedish cross-country skier. He competed in the 2014–2015 World Cup season.

He represented Sweden at the FIS Nordic World Ski Championships 2015 in Falun.

In January 2017, he announced his retirement from cross-country skiing.

Cross-country skiing results
All results are sourced from the International Ski Federation (FIS).

World Championships

World Cup

Season standings

References

External links 
 

1992 births
Living people
Swedish male cross-country skiers
Tour de Ski skiers